The 1983 Chatham Cup was the 56th annual nationwide knockout football competition in New Zealand.

Early stages of the competition were run in three regions (northern, central, and southern), with the National League teams receiving a bye until the fourth round of the competition. In all, 139 teams took part in the competition. Note: Different sources give different numberings for the rounds of the competition: some start round one with the beginning of the regional qualifications; others start numbering from the first national knock-out stage. The former numbering scheme is used in this article.

The 1983 final
The final was played at the home ground of Gisborne City, one of the two finalists. The replay was at the home ground of the other finalist, Mount Wellington. 

Mount Wellington appeared in their fifth consecutive final - the only club to have achieved this feat up until this time (it has since also been achieved by Christchurch United, between 1987 and 1991). Mount players Tony Sibley and Ron Armstrong joined an elite group to have played in four Chatham Cup-winning sides, having previously played in Mount Wellington's victories in 1973, 1980, and 1982.

The first match was a gritty, evenly matched affair, with any superiority which Mount Wellington may have had largely counteracted by the efforts of the vocal East Coast spectators. Fred de Jong opened the scoring for the Aucklanders after 14 minutes, only for Colin Walker to equalise halfway through the first half. In the second period Walker put the East Coasters ahead, and they held the advantage until the dying minutes when Keith Nelson, scorer of the only goal in the 1982 final, scored for the Mount to level the tie. Gisborne held on during extra time despite the Mount dominating the extra half-hour.

The replay, under floodlights at Mount Wellington's ground, was far less balanced. The Mount took the lead on the half-hour mark with a John Price penalty, and the game was put firmly out of Gisborne's reach just before the final whistle by a shot from Nelson.

Results

Third Round

* Won on penalties by Oratia United (3-0) and Mount Roskill (5-4)

Fourth Round

Fifth Round

* Napier City Rovers won 4-1 on penalties.

Quarter-finals

* Mount Wellington won 5-4 on penalties.

Semi-finals

Final

Replay

References

Rec.Sport.Soccer Statistics Foundation New Zealand 1983 page
UltimateNZSoccer website 1983 Chatham Cup page

Chatham Cup
Chatham Cup
Chatham Cup
Chat